LGA 77x may refer to:

 LGA 775 (Socket T)
 LGA 771 (Socket J)